Zippo Pat Bars (1964–1988) was an American Quarter horse racehorse and showhorse who became an influential sire in the breed.

Life
Zippo Pat Bars was a son of the Thoroughbred stallion Three Bars out of a daughter of Leo named Leo Pat. He was a 1964 sorrel stallion bred by Paul Curtner. As a weanling, Curtner was offered $20,000.00 for the colt, which he turned down.

Racing career 
Zippo Pat Bars raced for two years, starting eighteen times. He won five races and placed second four times. He earned a Race Register of Merit with the American Quarter Horse Association (or AQHA) in 1966 with an AAA speed rating. He earned $1855.00 on the racetrack. He injured himself as a two-year-old, fracturing two vertebrae in a stall accident. The injury kept the horse out of the 1966 All American Futurity.

Breeding record 
After the end of Zippo Pat Bars's racing career, he retired to the breeding shed. He sired, among others, Zippo Pine Bar, Scarborough Fair, The Invester, and Mr Pondie Zip. His sons Zippo Pine Bar and The Invester were inducted into the American Quarter Horse Hall of Fame as well as the National Snaffle Bit Association Hall of Fame. His grandson Zippos Mr Good Bar also was inducted into the AQHA Hall of Fame in 2019. In 2000, Zippos Mr Good Bar was inducted as well into the National Snaffle Bit Association Hall of Fame

Zippo Pat Bars sired nine AQHA Champions, as well as sixteen Superior Western Pleasure Horses and four Superior Halter Horses. In 1996, Zippo Pat Bars was inducted into the NSBA Hall of Fame.

Death and Honors 
Zippo Pat Bars died May 1, 1988 due to heart problems. He was inducted into the AQHA Hall of Fame in 2002.

Pedigree

Notes

References

 All Breed Pedigree Database Pedigree of Zippo Pat Bars accessed on June 27, 2007
 American Quarter Horse Foundation – Zippo Pat Bars accessed on September 2, 2017
 AQHA Hall of Fame accessed on September 2, 2017
 
 
 NSBA Hall of Fame accessed on July 5, 2007

External links
 Zippo Pat Bars at Quarter Horse Directory
 Zippo Pat Bars at Quarter Horse Legends

American Quarter Horse show horses
American Quarter Horse sires
1964 racehorse births
1988 racehorse deaths
AQHA Hall of Fame (horses)